Guerric Billet (born 30 April 1996) is a French kickboxer, currently competing in the lightweight division of Glory. He is the current ISKA World, and former European, K-1 super welterweight champion.

Kickboxing career
Billet made his Glory debut against Hafed Romdhane at Glory 60: Lyon on October 20, 2018. He won the fight by a third-round technical knockout.

Billet was scheduled to face Mohamed Azaab at Kick's Night on December 8, 2018. He won the fight by decision.

Billet returned to Glory to face Mickael Palandre at Glory 64: Strasbourg on March 9, 2019. He lost the fight by split decision.

Billet was scheduled to face Conan Saelens at The Pilon Fight Event on March 23, 2019. He won the fight by decision.

Billet was scheduled to face Dominiki Matusz at Tournoi Du Dragon 13 on April 13, 2019. He won the fight by decision.

Billet fought with Glory for the third time against William Goldie-Galloway at Glory 66: Paris on June 22, 2019. He won the fight by unanimous decision.

Billet made his fourth Glory appearance against Mohammed Hendouf at Glory 70: Lyon on 	October 26, 2019. He lost the fight by split decision.

Billet challenged Mattia Solarino for the European IPCC 72.5 kg title at Pegasus Fight on December 7, 2019. He won the fight by decision.

Billet was scheduled to face Artur Saładiak at Glory 75: Utrecht on February 29, 2020. He won the fight by unanimous decision.

Billet was scheduled to face David Ruiz for the ISKA European super welterweight title at The Pilon Fight Event on June 12, 2021. He won the fight by decision.

Billet was scheduled to fight Christian Zahe at Fight Night One on July 2, 2021. He won the fight by a first-round knockout.

Billet faced Yankuba Juwara at Gala du Phenix Muaythai 12 on July 31, 2021. He won the fight by a second-round technical knockout.

Billet was scheduled to face Itay Gershon at Glory 77: Rotterdam on January 30, 2021. The bout was later scrapped, as Gershon was unable to enter Netherlands because of Israel’s closed borders due to the COVID-19 pandemic. The fight between the two was rescheduled for Glory 78: Rotterdam, which was held on September 4, 2021. The fight was ruled a split draw.

Billet was scheduled to face Yunus Korkmaz for the vacant ISKA World Super Welterweight K-1 title at Sifight Night VIP on October 2, 2021. He won the fight by decision.

Billet was scheduled to face the WKN super welterweight champion Jordi Requejo at Nuit Des Champions 28 on November 20, 2021, in a non-title bout. He lost the fight by decision.

Billet was booked to face promotional newcomer Nordin Ben Moh at Glory 80 on March 19, 2022. He won the fight by unanimous decision.

Billet was scheduled to face Francesco Maggio at Fight Night One 10 on April 9, 2022. He won the fight by a third-round technical knockout.

Billet was scheduled to face Taras Hnatchuk in the main event of Bancho Cup on April 23, 2022. He won the fight by decision.

Billet faced Stoyan Koprivlenski at Glory 81: Ben Saddik vs. Adegbuy 2 on August 20, 2022. He lost the fight by unanimous decision.

Billet faced Alcorac Caballero for the vacant WAKO-PRO K-1 European super middleweight (-78.1kg) title at Tiger's Fight on November 27, 2022. He won the fight by decision. At the end of the year, he was named the best French K-1 fighter of 2022 by Boxemag.

Billet faced Cihad Akipa at Glory 83 on February 11, 2023. He won the fight by split decision.

Championships and accomplishments

Professional
World Association of Kickboxing Organizations
 2022 WAKO Pro K-1 European Super Middleweight (-78.1kg) Champion

 International Sport Karate Association
 2021 ISKA World Super Welterweight Championship
 2021 ISKA European Super Welterweight Championship

 International Professional Combat Council
 2019 IPCC 72.5 kg European Championship

Amateur
Fédération française de kick boxing, muay thaï et disciplines associées
 2017 FFKMDA Kickboxing A-class -75kg Runner-up
 2017 FFKMDA Full Contact A-class -75kg Champion
 2018 FFKMDA Full Contact A-class -75kg Champion
 2018 FFKMDA Kickboxing A-class -75kg Champion
 2018 FFKMDA K-1 A-class -75kg Champion

World Association of Kickboxing Organizations
  2018 Bestfighter WAKO World Cup (-71kg)

Fight record

|- style="background:#;"
| 2023-04-29 || ||align=left| Said Ennayeb || Fight Night One || Chalon-sur-Saône, France ||  ||  ||

|- style="background:#cfc;"
| 2023-02-11|| Win ||align=left| Cihad Akipa || Glory 83 || Essen, Germany || Decision (Split) || 3 || 3:00

|- style="background:#cfc;"
| 2022-11-27 || Win ||align=left| Alcorac Caballero || Tiger's Fight || Dijon, France || Decision (Unanimous) || 5 ||3:00 
|-
! style=background:white colspan=9 |

|- style="background:#fbb;"
| 2022-08-20 || Loss ||align=left| Stoyan Koprivlenski || Glory 81: Ben Saddik vs. Adegbuyi 2 || Düsseldorf, Germany || Decision (Unanimous) || 3 ||3:00 
|-
! style=background:white colspan=9 |

|- style="background:#cfc"
|  2022-04-23 || Win || align="left" | Taras Hnatchuk || The Bancho Cup || Thurins, France || Decision || 3 || 3:00

|-  style="background:#cfc"
| 2022-04-09 || Win ||align=left| Francesco Maggio || Fight Night One 10 || Saint-Étienne, France || TKO (Corner stoppage) || 3 ||
|-  style="background:#cfc"
| 2022-03-19 || Win ||align=left| Nordin Ben Moh || Glory 80 || Hasselt, Belgium || Decision (Unanimous) || 3 ||3:00
|-  style="background:#fbb"
| 2021-11-20 || Loss||align=left| Jordi Requejo || Nuit Des Champions 28 || Marseille, France || Decision (Unanimous) || 3 ||3:00 
|-
|-  style="background:#cfc;"
| 2021-10-02|| Win ||align=left| Yunus Korkmaz || Sifight Night VIP|| Troyes, France || Decision || 5 || 3:00
|-
! style=background:white colspan=9 |
|-  style="background:#c5d2ea;"
| 2021-09-04|| Draw ||align=left| Itay Gershon || Glory 78: Rotterdam || Rotterdam, Netherlands || Draw (Split) || 3 || 3:00
|-
|-  style="background:#cfc;"
| 2021-07-31|| Win ||align=left| Yankuba Juwara  || Gala du Phenix Muaythai 12  || Trets, France || TKO (Corner stoppage/Low kick) || 2 || 
|-
|-  style="background:#cfc;"
| 2021-07-02 || Win ||align=left| Christian Zahe || Fight Night One || Saint-Étienne, France || KO (Straight to the Body) || 1 || 
|-
|-  style="background:#cfc;"
| 2021-06-12 || Win ||align=left| David Ruiz  || The Pilon Fight Event || Le Creusot, France || Decision || 5 || 3:00
|-
! style=background:white colspan=9 |
|-  style="background:#cfc;"
| 2020-02-29 || Win ||align=left| Artur Saładiak || Glory 75: Utrecht || Utrecht, Netherlands || Decision (Unanimous) || 3 || 3:00
|-
|-  style="background:#cfc;"
| 2019-12-07 || Win ||align=left| Mattia Solarino || Pegasus Fight || Morges, Switzerland || Decision || 5 || 3:00
|-
! style=background:white colspan=9 |
|-  style="background:#fbb;"
| 2019-10-26 || Loss ||align=left| Mohammed Hendouf || Glory 70: Lyon || Lyon, France || Decision (Split) || 3 || 3:00
|-
|-  style="background:#cfc;"
| 2019-06-22 || Win ||align=left| William Goldie-Galloway || Glory 66: Paris || Paris, France || Decision (Unanimous) || 3 || 3:00
|-
|-  style="background:#cfc;"
| 2019-04-13 || Win ||align=left| Dominiki Matusz || Tournoi Du Dragon 13 || Saint-Yzan-de-Soudiac, France || Decision || 3 || 3:00
|-
|-  style="background:#cfc;"
| 2019-03-23 || Win ||align=left| Conan Saelens || The Pilon Fight Event || Le Creusot, France || Decision || 3 || 3:00
|-
|-  style="background:#fbb;"
| 2019-03-09 || Loss ||align=left| Mickael Palandre ||Glory 64: Strasbourg || Strasbourg, France || Decision (Split) || 3 || 3:00
|-
|-  style="background:#cfc;"
| 2018-12-08 || Win ||align=left| Mohamed Azaab || Kick's Night  || Agde, France || Decision || 3 || 3:00
|-
|-  style="background:#cfc;"
| 2018-10-20 || Win ||align=left| Hafed Romdhane || Glory 60: Lyon || Lyon, France || TKO (Punches) || 3 || 1:42

|-  style="background:#cfc;"
| 2018-04-07 || Win ||align=left| Benjamin Boutet ||  Tournoi du Dragon 12 || Saint-Yzan-de-Soudiac, France || Decision || 3 || 2:00

|-  style="background:#cfc;"
| 2017-12-09 || Win ||align=left| Alexandre Paris ||  Kick's Night 2017 || Agde, France || Decision || 3 || 2:00

|-  style="background:#cfc;"
| 2016-11-19 || Win ||align=left| Nicolas Chaussiere ||  Pilon Fight Event || Le Creusot, France || Decision || 3 || 3:00
|-
| colspan=9 | Legend:    

|-  style="background:#CCFFCC;"
| 2018-06-21|| Win ||align=left| Daniel Getsov || Bestfighter Wako World Cup, Final || Rimini, Italy || Decision ||  || 
|-
! style=background:white colspan=9 |
|-  style="background:#CCFFCC;"
| 2018-06-20|| Win ||align=left| Mateusz Nizejewski  || Bestfighter Wako World Cup, Semi Final || Rimini, Italy || Decision  ||  || 
|-
| colspan=9 | Legend:

See also
 List of male kickboxers

References

1996 births
Living people
French male kickboxers
Sportspeople from Le Creusot
Glory kickboxers